Muhammad Shahfiq bin Ghani (born 17 March 1992) is a Singaporean professional footballer who plays as a central-midfielder, defensive-midfielder or forward for Singapore Premier League club Geylang International and the Singapore National Team. Shahfiq is known as a free kick specialist.

Club career

Young Lions
Shahfiq began his club career with S.League club Young Lions in 2010. He scored 7 goals in 37 competitive matches over three Seasons from 2010 to 2012.

LionsXII
Shahfiq was selected to be in the LionsXII squad in 2013. He contributed with 5 goals in 13 MSL matches as LionsXII won the 2013 Malaysia Super League. He drew criticism from head coach V. Sundramoorthy for his dismissal for slapping Sarawak's Muamer Salibašić in a Malaysia Cup match on 24 August 2013.

A spinal injury threatened to rule Shahfiq out for the start of the 2014 season. He missed the Charity Cup match against Pahang and the Malaysia FA Cup match against DRB-Hicom, returning as a 74th-minute substitute against Selangor on 25 January. In total, he spent only 77 minutes on the pitch for his club in 2014.

During his two-year spell with LionsXII, he scored six goals in 31 appearances.

Return to Young Lions
In 2015, Shahfiq return to the Young Lions, where he scored 5 goals in 22 league appearances for his club.

Geylang International
In 2016, it was announced that Shahfiq would be joining Geylang International at the start of the 2016 S.League season on a 2 year contract. However, he tore the anterior cruciate ligament in his knee during pre-season training and was ruled out for 6 months. This resulted in Shafiq missing most of the games of the season although he did make a return during the second half of the season. He returned to full fitness in July and made a surprise cameo appearance in the League Cup Plate Final against Hougang United. He marked his return from injury by scoring a goal for his club in a friendly match against the Cambodia national football team and laying off an assist for a last gasp goal in a 2-1 victory over Balestier Khalsa in the league.

He scored in his first goal for the club during the last game of the season in a 4-1 win over Home United. He came back strongly enough to be recalled back to the national team and making the final 23 for Singapore's disappointing 2016 AFF Championship.

Shahfiq scored his first goal of the 2017 S.League season in a 2-0 win over Brunei DPMM FC while also winning another penalty which teammate Víctor Coto converted.

Hougang United
After being rumoured to join UKM F.C. in Malaysia, Shahfiq signed for Hougang United in 2018.

International career
Shahfiq was part of the Singapore national under-23 football team that won the bronze medal at the 2013 Southeast Asian Games.

He earned his first senior international cap in a friendly match against Hong Kong on 15 August 2012. His first international goal came against China PR in a friendly match in 2013.

Personal life
Shahfiq graduated from the Singapore Sports School in 2008.

Career statistics

Club
. Caps and goals may not be correct.

 Young Lions and LionsXII are ineligible for qualification to AFC competitions in their respective leagues.
 Young Lions withdrew from the 2011 and 2012 Singapore Cup and the 2011 Singapore League Cup due to their players participating in AFC and AFF youth competitions.

International
International goals

Statistics accurate as of match played 5 March 2014

U23 International goals

Honours

Club
LionsXII
Malaysia Super League: 2013

International
Singapore
Southeast Asian Games: Bronze 2013

References 

Living people
1992 births
Singaporean footballers
Singapore international footballers
Singaporean expatriate footballers
Singapore Premier League players
LionsXII players
Singaporean people of Malay descent
Association football forwards
Association football midfielders
Malaysia Super League players
Young Lions FC players
Footballers at the 2014 Asian Games
Southeast Asian Games bronze medalists for Singapore
Southeast Asian Games medalists in football
Competitors at the 2013 Southeast Asian Games
Asian Games competitors for Singapore